Gustavo Badell aka "the Freakin' 'Rican", (born November 3, 1972) is an International Federation of BodyBuilders professional bodybuilder.

Background 
Badell was born in Venezuela and moved to Puerto Rico when he was around 22 years old. He began lifting weights at the age of fifteen to increase his size for boxing. Gustavo gained muscle incredibly fast, and when he was 19 entered and won his first bodybuilding competition, the 1991 Junior Caribbean Bodybuilding Championships.

After six years of weight training he was able to turn professional by winning the 1997 Caribbean Championships. His first International Federation of BodyBuilders appearance was in 1998 when he competed in the Grand Prix of Germany. He first competed in the International Federation of BodyBuilders Night of Champions (now called the New York Pro) in 1999, where he finished in 14th place. His first Ironman Pro Invitational was in 2000, where he was 18th. His first Mr. Olympia appearance was in 2002, where he was 24th. His first Arnold Classic was in 2004, where he was 7th. His professional placings were lackluster until 2003 when he started placing higher, in part because of help from the fellow professional bodybuilder Milos Sarcev. Badell has appeared in many fitness and magazine articles as well as on the cover of Flex magazine. He has appeared in numerous advertisements for MuscleTech, normally for Nitrotech Hardcore protein powder and Masstech weight-gain powder.

Profile 
 Current residence: Puerto Rico
 Family: ex-wife Jessica, children: Barbie Ann, Nicole Marie, Michael Gustavo and Christian Carlos Badell
 Height: 5ft 7.7in (172 cm)
 Competition weight: 
 Offseason weight:

Contest history 
 1991 Junior Caribbean Championships, overall winner
 1997 Caribbean Championships, overall winner (received pro card)
 1997 World Amateur Championships Heavyweight, 10th
 1998 Grand Prix Germany, 9th
 1999 Grand Prix England, 17th
 1999 Night of Champions, Did Not Place
 1999 World Pro Championships, 14th
 2000 Ironman Pro Invitational, 18th
 2000 Night of Champions, Did Not Place
 2000 Toronto Pro Invitational, Did Not Place
2000 World Pro Championships, 11th
2001 Grand Prix England, Did Not Place
2001 Ironman Pro Invitational, 16th
2001 San Francisco Pro Invitational, 11th
2002 Ironman Pro Invitational, 13th
2002 Night of Champions, 10th
2002 Mr. Olympia, 24th
2002 Southwest Pro Cup, 6th
2002 Toronto Pro Invitational, 3rd
2004 Arnold Classic, 7th
2004 Ironman Pro Invitational, 3rd
2004 San Francisco Pro Invitational, 4th
2004 Show of Strength Pro Championship, 3rd
2004 Mr. Olympia, 3rd
2005 Arnold Classic, 3rd
2005 Ironman Pro Invitational, 1st
2005 Mr. Olympia, 3rd
2006 Arnold Classic, 4th
2006 San Francisco Pro Invitational, 1st
2006 Mr. Olympia, 6th
2007 Arnold Classic, 4th
2007 Mr. Olympia 8th
2008 Ironman Pro Invitational, 2nd
2008 Arnold Classic, 6th
2008 Mr. Olympia, 10th
2009 Atlantic City Pro, 1st
2009 Mr. Olympia, 13th
2012 Arnold Classic, 13th

See also 
List of male professional bodybuilders
List of female professional bodybuilders

References 
Perine, Shawn, "Mucho Gustavo Badell, that is. There's a lot to like about this 240-pounder. Here's how he built his 21½-inch arms", Muscle & Fitness, August 2004. Weider Publication. Accessed 6 June 2006.

External links 
Gustavo Badell - Duza galeria - Aktualności - Kulturystyka i Fitness 

1972 births
Living people
Professional bodybuilders
Venezuelan bodybuilders